Thanjavur Subha Rao (also known as Subharao Tanjavarkar, also spelled Subba Row) was an Indian administrator and musician who served as the dewan of the state of Travancore in the 1830s.

Subha Rao was a native of Thanjavur and was born into a Thanjavur Marathi Deshastha Brahmin family. He was so fluent in English that he was also known as "English" Subha Rao. He tutored the Maharaja of Travancore Swathi Thirunal in Sanskrit, Marathi, political science and Carnatic music. In 1830, he was appointed Dewan of Travancore.

References 

Diwans of Travancore
People from Thanjavur district